Outrider is an album by Jimmy Page, released by Geffen Records on 19 June 1988. It is his only solo studio album and the first time since 1969 he has recorded with a record label other than Atlantic Records/Swan Song Records. Page recorded the music at his personal studio The Sol. Robert Plant guests on one track, "The Only One", while John Bonham's son Jason plays drums.

This was originally intended to be a two album release. However, during the early recording stages of this album, Page's house was broken into and amongst the items stolen were the demo tapes which had been recorded up to that point. Page didn't record any demos prior to recording the album itself.

Reception

The album reached No. 26 on the Billboard 200 chart, also peaking at No. 27 on the UK Album Chart.

Years later, Jimmy Page reflected on the album in rather positive terms:

{{quote|Outriders all right. It's demo-like compared with those overproduced albums that came out at the time. It didn't do very well—doesn't matter—but I did tour. I was playing music on that tour going right back to The Yardbirds. Jason [Bonham] was the drummer on that tour.}}

Track listing

PersonnelMusiciansJimmy Page – guitars, synthesizer, backing vocals, production
Tony Franklin – bass guitar on "Wasting My Time"
Felix Krish – bass guitar on "The Only One", "Liquid Mercury", "Emerald Eyes", "Prison Blues", and "Blues Anthem (If I Cannot Have Your Love...)"
Durban Laverde – bass guitar on "Wanna Make Love", "Writes of Winter", and "Hummingbird"
Chris Farlowe – vocals on "Hummingbird", "Prison Blues", and "Blues Anthem (If I Cannot Have Your Love...)"
John Miles – vocals on "Wasting My Time" and "Wanna Make Love"
Robert Plant – vocals on "The Only One"
Barriemore Barlow – drums, percussion on "Liquid Mercury" and "Emerald Eyes"
Jason Bonham – drums, percussionTechnical'''
Peter Ashworth – photography
Dick Beetham – assistant engineering
Steve Hoyland – assistant engineering
JL – artwork and cover co-ordination
George Marino – mastering at Sterling Sound, New York
Leif Mases – engineering, mixing

Charts
Weekly charts

Singles

Certifications

Accolades

 Tour 

See also
 Celebration Day''
 The Honeydrippers
 Page and Plant

References

1988 debut albums
Albums produced by Jimmy Page
Geffen Records albums
Jimmy Page albums